Ankole sub-region is a region in the Western Region of Uganda that consists of the following districts:

 Buhweju District
 Bushenyi District
 Ibanda District
 Isingiro District
 Kazo District
 Kiruhura District
 Mbarara District
 Mbarara City
 Mitooma District
 Ntungamo District
 Rwampara District
 Rubirizi District
 Sheema District

The area covered by the above districts constituted the traditional Ankole Kingdom. Milton Obote abolished the traditional kingdoms in Uganda in 1967. When Yoweri Museveni re-established them in 1993, Ankole did not re-constitute itself.

The sub-region is home mainly to the Ankole ethnic group. The people of Ankole are called Banyankole (singular: Munyankole). The Banyankole speak Runyankole, a Bantu language. Runyankole is very similar to Rukiga, spoken by the people of the neighboring Kigezi sub-region. According to the 2014 national census, the Ankole sub-region was home to an estimated 2.56 million people at that time.

See also
 Regions of Uganda
 Districts of Uganda

References

 
Sub-regions of Uganda
Western Region, Uganda